Gry Maritha is a freight ship based at Penzance in Cornwall, England, United Kingdom, run by the Isles of Scilly Steamship Company.

History

Gry Maritha was built by Moen Slip in Norway, in 1981. The ship was named after the daughter of the first captain, Tor Sevaldsen.

Purchased in 1989 by the Isles of Scilly Steamship Company, she is a lifeline to the communities on the Isles of Scilly as she provides the only method of bulk freight transport from the United Kingdom mainland. She carries just six passengers and was acquired for all year cargo and winter passenger services, as Scillonian III is laid up through the winter. Between 12,000 and 14,000 tonnes of cargo a year are normally carried by Scillonian III and Gry Maritha.

Most notably, Gry Maritha carries all the fuel requirements of the Isles of Scilly, using transportable fuel tanks on her deck. These are loaded and unloaded by the deck crane. Towards the stern, the deck can accept standard freight containers.

References

External links

Isles of Scilly Travel

Ferries of the United Kingdom
Water transport in Cornwall
Transport in the Isles of Scilly
Ferries of South West England
1981 ships